Luis Alberto Escobar Hernandez (born May 30, 1996) is a Colombian professional baseball pitcher for the Olmecas de Tabasco of the Mexican League. He has played in Major League Baseball (MLB) for the Pittsburgh Pirates.

Professional career

Pittsburgh Pirates
Escobar signed with the Pittsburgh Pirates as an international free agent in July 2013. He made his professional debut in 2014 for the DSL Pirates and spent the whole season there, posting a 2–4 record and a 4.75 ERA in 13 games started. In 2015, he played for both the GCL Pirates and the West Virginia Black Bears, pitching to a combined 2–1 record, 3.83 ERA, and a 1.13 WHIP in 13 starts, and in 2016, he returned to the Black Bears, posting a 6–5 record and 2.93 ERA in 15 games (12 starts).

Escobar was on Colombia's roster for the 2017 World Baseball Classic but did not play. Escobar represented the Pirates in the 2017 All-Star Futures Game. He spent the 2017 season with the West Virginia Power where he posted a 10–7 record and a 3.83 ERA with 168 strikeouts in 131.2 innings pitched (26 games, 25 starts). The Pirates added him to their 40-man roster after the 2017 season. He split the 2018 season between the Bradenton Marauders and the Altoona Curve, going a combined 11–6 with a 4.14 in 127 innings. He opened the 2019 season with Bradenton, before being promoted to the Indianapolis Indians on May 9. 

On July 6, 2019, the Pirates promoted Escobar to the major leagues. He made his major league debut on July 13, striking out one batter over two scoreless innings in relief. Escobar was designated for assignment on November 20, 2019, and outrighted to AAA on November 27. Escobar was released by the Pirates organization on June 9, 2020.

Olmecas de Tabasco
On April 22, 2021, Escobar signed with the Olmecas de Tabasco of the Mexican League. He posted a 1.17 WHIP over 67.1 innings and led the league with the lowest ERA (2.54).

Fubon Guardians
On January 6, 2022, Escobar signed with the Fubon Guardians of the Chinese Professional Baseball League for the 2022 season. On May 23, 2022, Escobar requested and was granted his release due to personal reasons. He never appeared in a game for the Guardians and only pitched for their farm team prior to his release.

Olmecas de Tabasco (second stint)
On July 5, 2022, Escobar signed with the Olmecas de Tabasco of the Mexican League.

References

External links

1996 births
Living people
Águilas del Zulia players
Colombian expatriate baseball players in Venezuela
Altoona Curve players
Bradenton Marauders players
Colombian expatriate baseball players in Mexico
Colombian expatriate baseball players in the United States
Dominican Summer League Pirates players
Colombian expatriate baseball players in the Dominican Republic
Gulf Coast Pirates players
Indianapolis Indians players
Major League Baseball pitchers
Major League Baseball players from Colombia
Olmecas de Tabasco players
Sportspeople from Cartagena, Colombia
Pittsburgh Pirates players
West Virginia Black Bears players
West Virginia Power players
2017 World Baseball Classic players